Columbian larkspur or Columbia larkspur is a common name for several plants and may refer to:

Delphinium nuttallii, native to Washington and Oregon
Delphinium trolliifolium, native to Washington, Oregon, and northern California